Vinicius Galvão Leal  (born August 12, 1989, Brazil) is a Brazilian footballer currently under contract for Austrian side Union Sparkasse Pettenbach.

Club career

Debreceni VSC

Club Statistics

Club statistics

Updated to games played as of August 4, 2012.

References

External links

MLSZ 

1989 births
Living people
Footballers from Porto Alegre
Brazilian footballers
Association football forwards
Debreceni VSC players
Nyíregyháza Spartacus FC players
Expatriate footballers in Hungary
Brazilian expatriate sportspeople in Hungary
Brazilian expatriate footballers